General elections were held in Japan on 25 March 1915. The Rikken Dōshikai party emerged as the largest party in the House of Representatives, winning 153 of the 381 seats.

Electoral system
The 381 members of the House of Representatives were elected in 51 multi-member constituencies based on prefectures and cities. Voting was restricted to men aged over 25 who paid at least 10 yen a year in direct taxation.

Results

References

General elections in Japan
Japan
1915 elections in Japan
March 1915 events
Election and referendum articles with incomplete results